Velanda is a locality situated in Trollhättan Municipality, Västra Götaland County, Sweden with 581 inhabitants in 2010.

References

See also
 Velanda Runestone

Populated places in Västra Götaland County
Populated places in Trollhättan Municipality